Wei Junxing (born October 1955) is a former Chinese politician who spent most of his career in Liaoning province in northeast China. In January 2015, Wei was put under investigation by the Communist Party of China's anti-corruption agency. Previously he served as Deputy Secretary-general of Liaoning provincial government and the Party Secretary of Kaiyuan, and briefly as Mayor of Jinzhou.

Life and career
Wei was born and raised in Heishan County, Liaoning. He graduated from Liaoning Textile Industry College. Beginning in 1982, he served in several posts in Kaiyuan Textile Mill, where he was eventually promoted to plant manager and the Communist Party Secretary of the mill.

He served as Vice Mayor of Kaiyuan from March 1997 to January 1999, and Communist Party Secretary, the top political position in the city, from January 2001 to December 2010, while also holding a seat on the Party Standing Committee of Tieling, the prefecture-level city of which Kaiyuan is under jurisdiction. Kaiyuan's national prominence grew significantly during Wei's term in office, mostly due to the fame of sketch comedy star Zhao Benshan, who is native to the area. Wei attended the premiere of the third installment of Xiangcun Aiqing ("Rural Love") produced by Zhao Benshan in December 2009. At the event, Wei showered Zhao with praise, saying, "Thank you to our dear Benshan, who has supported the development of Tieling and Kaiyuan in recent years. Tieling is now famous because it is known as the home of Zhao Benshan. Tieling will continue to provide the strongest support possible to Zhao Benshan and his artistic and life endeavours."

In December 2010, he was appointed Deputy Communist Party Secretary and Vice Mayor of Jinzhou, and later Mayor of Jinzhou, he remained in that position until January 2011, when he was transferred to Shenyang, capital of Liaoning province, and appointed the Deputy Secretary-general of the Liaoning government.

On January 16, 2014, he has been put under investigation for alleged violations of discipline and law. His links to Zhao Benshan have been highlighted by Chinese-language media.

References

1955 births
Chinese Communist Party politicians from Liaoning
Living people
Political office-holders in Liaoning
People's Republic of China politicians from Liaoning
Politicians from Jinzhou